Rebels FC is a British Virgin Islands football club based in Road Town. The club competes in the BVIFA National Football League, the top tier of British Virgin Islands football. 

The club was founded in 2009, and play their home matches in the 1,500-capacity, A. O. Shirley Recreation Ground.

References

External links 
 BVIFA Club Profile

Football clubs in the British Virgin Islands
2009 establishments in the British Virgin Islands